Several video games based on Hirohiko Araki's long-running manga and anime series JoJo's Bizarre Adventure have been released. The first was a role-playing video game based on the third story arc which used the series's title, released in March of 1993 for the Super Famicom. On December 1, 1998, Capcom released a arcade fighting game, which was also adapted from the third arc; the game was titled simply JoJo's Bizarre Adventure (though it was released as JoJo's Venture in the west), with an updated version titled JoJo's Bizarre Adventure: Heritage for the Future released later that year. The arcade game was ported to both the PlayStation and Dreamcast on October 14, 1999, and a high-definition version was released for PlayStation Network and Xbox Live Arcade on August 21, 2012. These fighting games were the first pieces of JoJo related media released in North America, exposing the characters to many western players for the first time.

A third Capcom game based on Part 5, titled GioGio's Bizarre Adventure, was released for the PlayStation 2 on July 25, 2002, combining the arcade game's fighting gameplay with cel-shaded 3D environments. The game was slated for an international release, but ultimately never left Japan. Bandai then acquired the video game rights to the series. Developed by Anchor Inc. and published by Bandai, JoJo’s Bizarre Adventure: Phantom Blood was released on October 26, 2006 for the PlayStation 2. The story is based on the first arc, and the game features gameplay similar to GioGio's Bizarre Adventure. 

At a July 5, 2012 press conference celebrating the 25th anniversary of JoJo, Araki himself announced JoJo's Bizarre Adventure: All Star Battle for the PlayStation 3, produced by CyberConnect2 and published by Bandai Namco Games. Released on August 29, 2013, the game is a 2D fighting game that takes inspiration from Capcom's arcade titles. The same developer and publisher would later release JoJo's Bizarre Adventure: Eyes of Heaven, an arena-based fighting game that itself takes mechanics from All Star Battle, on December 17, 2015. On December 18, 2019, a battle royale arcade game titled JoJo's Bizarre Adventure: Last Survivor was released in arcades.

Before the first JoJo game was released, Bandai released a Weekly Shōnen Jump crossover adventure game titled Famicom Jump: Hero Retsuden on February 15, 1989. Joseph Joestar from the second arc is one of the playable characters, while Santana and Speedwagon made cameo appearances. Its sequel Famicom Jump II: Saikyō no Shichinin, released on December 2, 1991, features Jotaro as a selectable character. Joseph, Avdol, Kakyoin and Polnareff also appear in this game. Both games were available on the Famicom. Characters from JoJo's Bizarre Adventure were also featured in the 2005 Nintendo DS Weekly Shōnen Jump crossover game Jump Super Stars and its sequel Jump Ultimate Stars, including Jotaro Kujo and Dio Brando as playable characters.

In 2014 as the JoJo anime was being popularized, Bandai added Jonathan and Joseph Joestar to the roster of J-Stars Victory Vs. In 2019, 10 days before the launch of Jump Force, Jotaro and Dio from Part 3 were announced to be added to the roster of playable characters, with Dio only being playable on stages that had a nighttime theme. Giorno Giovanna was later added to the game as DLC.

List of games
All of the games listed below have been, or are being, released in Japan. To date, Capcom's JoJo's Bizarre Adventure and CyberConnect2's All Star Battle and Eyes of Heaven have been the only games from the series released in the West.

Main series
JoJo's Bizarre Adventure (1993 - Super Famicom - Cobra Team) - Role-playing game
JoJo's Bizarre Adventure (1998 - Arcade, PlayStation - Capcom) - Fighting game
JoJo's Bizarre Adventure: Heritage for the Future (1999 - Arcade, Dreamcast - Capcom) - Updated revision
JoJo's Bizarre Adventure HD Ver. (2012 - PlayStation Network, Xbox Live Arcade - Capcom) - High-definition port
GioGio's Bizarre Adventure (2002 - PlayStation 2 - Capcom) - Action-adventure game
JoJo's Bizarre Adventure: Phantom Blood (2006 - PlayStation 2 - Bandai) - Beat-'em-up
JoJo's Bizarre Adventure: All Star Battle (2013 - PlayStation 3 - CyberConnect2) - Fighting game
JoJo's Bizarre Adventure: All Star Battle R (2022 - Microsoft Windows, Nintendo Switch, PlayStation 4, PlayStation 5, Xbox One, Xbox Series X/S - CyberConnect2) - Updated remaster
JoJo's Bizarre Adventure: Stardust Shooters (2014 - iOS, Android - Drecom) - Medal Shooting Action
JoJo's Bizarre Adventure: Eyes of Heaven (2015 - PlayStation 3, PlayStation 4 - CyberConnect2) - Fighting game
JoJo's Bizarre Adventure: Diamond Records (2017 - iOS, Android) - Action
JoJo's Pitter Patter Pop! (2018 - iOS, Android) - Tile-matching puzzle game
JoJo's Bizarre Adventure: Last Survivor (2019 - Arcade - Bandai Namco) - Battle royale game
 (TBA - Android, iOS - Shengqu Games) - TBA

Appearances
 (1989 - Family Computer - Bandai) - Crossover role-playing game
 (1991 -Famicom - Bandai) - Crossover role-playing game
 (2005 - Nintendo DS - Ganbarion) - Crossover fighting game
 (2006 - Nintendo DS - Ganbarion) - Crossover fighting game
 (2014 - PlayStation 3, PlayStation Vita, PlayStation 4- Namco Bandai Games) - Crossover fighting game
Shonen Jump Ore Collection (2017 - iOS, Android)
 (2019 - PlayStation 4, Xbox One, Windows, Nintendo Switch - Namco Bandai Games) - Crossover fighting game

Sales

References

External links
 JoJo's Bizarre Adventure by Capcom 
 JoJo's Bizarre Adventure: Heritage for the Future by Capcom 
 JoJo's Bizarre Adventure: Phantom Blood by Bandai 
 JoJo's Bizarre Adventure: All-Star Battle by Bandai 
 

Bandai Namco Entertainment franchises
Capcom franchises
 
Shueisha franchises
Lists of video games by franchise